Dan Lemmon is a New Zealand visual effects supervisor. In 2012, he was nominated for an Academy Award for the movie Rise of the Planet of the Apes. This was in the category of Academy Award for Best Visual Effects, his nomination was shared with Daniel Barrett, Joe Letteri and R. Christopher White.

His second nomination was at the 87th Academy Awards for the film Dawn of the Planet of the Apes. His nomination was shared with Letteri, Barrett, and Erik Winquist. He received his third nomination (and first win) at the 89th Academy Awards for The Jungle Book, together with Robert Legato, Adam Valdez, and Andrew R. Jones. His fourth nomination was at the 90th Academy Awards for the film War for the Planet of the Apes, together with Letteri, Barrett, and Joel Whist. His fifth nomination was at the 95th Academy Awards for the superhero film, The Batman, with Russell Earl, Anders Langlands and Dominic Tuohy.

Early career
Lemmon graduated from Brigham Young University (BYU) and was one of the early students in the BYU Center for Animation. One of Lemmon's earliest credits was for modeling, coloring, lighting, and compositing work on Titanic.

Filmography
 The Batman (visual effects supervisor), 2022
 War for the Planet of the Apes (visual effects supervisor), 2017
 The Jungle Book (visual effects supervisor: Weta Digital), 2016
 Dawn of the Planet of the Apes (visual effects supervisor), 2014
 Man of Steel (visual effects supervisor: Weta Digital), 2013
 Rise of the Planet of the Apes (visual effects supervisor), 2011 
 Avatar (visual effects supervisor: Weta Digital), 2009
 Jumper (visual effects supervisor: Weta Digital), 2008
 Enchanted (visual effects supervisor: Weta Digital), 2007 
 30 Days of Night (visual effects supervisor), 2007
 Bridge to Terabithia (digital effects supervisor), 2007
 King Kong (digital effects supervisor), 2005
 I, Robot (CG supervisor: Weta Digital), 2004
 Van Helsing (computer graphics supervisor), 2004
 The Lord of the Rings: The Return of the King (3D sequence supervisor: Weta Digital), 2003
 The Lord of the Rings: The Two Towers (3D sequence lead technical director: Weta Digital), 2002
 We Were Soldiers (computer graphics supervisor: Digital Domain), 2002
 A Beautiful Mind (technical developer: Digital Domain), 2001
 The Lord of the Rings: The Fellowship of the Ring (technical developer: Digital Domain)  2001 
 Dr. Seuss' How the Grinch Stole Christmas (technical lead), 2000 
 Supernova (digital artist), 2000
 Fight Club (digital artist: Digital Domain - as Daniel Lemmon), 1999
 Titanic (character integration artist: Digital Domain), 1997

Awards and honors

Academy Awards

References

External links

Living people
Best Visual Effects Academy Award winners
Best Visual Effects BAFTA Award winners
Special effects people
Year of birth missing (living people)
Place of birth missing (living people)